Browserify is an open-source JavaScript bundler tool that allows developers to write and use Node.js-style modules that compile for use in the browser.

Examples

Execution 
$ browserify source.js -o target.js

This adds the source of all the required modules and their dependencies used in source.js and bundles them in target.js. Browserify traverses the dependency graph, using your source.js as its entry point, and includes the source of every dependency it finds.

See also 

 JavaScript framework
 JavaScript library

References 

JavaScript libraries
JavaScript programming tools
Software using the MIT license